Spaceman is a 1997 science fiction/comedy film from Palm Pictures. Filmed in Chicago, it tells of a man adjusting to life on Earth, with one problem: he has been trained only to be a killer since he was abducted as a toddler.

References

External links
Official Website
 

1997 films
1990s science fiction comedy films
1997 comedy films
1990s English-language films